Chironius is a genus of New World colubrid snakes, commonly called sipos (from the Portuguese word cipó for liana), savanes, or sometimes vine snakes. There are 23 described species in this genus.

Species
The following 23 species are recognized as being valid.
Chironius bicarinatus (Wied, 1820) – two-headed sipo
Chironius brazili 
Chironius carinatus (Linnaeus, 1758) – machete savane
Chironius challenger Kok, 2010
Chironius diamantina 
Chironius exoletus (Linnaeus, 1758) – Linnaeus' sipo
Chironius flavolineatus (Boettger, 1885) – Boettger's sipo
Chironius flavopictus 
Chironius foveatus Bailey, 1955
Chironius fuscus (Linnaeus, 1758) – brown sipo
Chironius gouveai Entiauspe-Neto, Lúcio-Lyra, Koch, Marques-Quintela, Diesel-Abegg, & Loebmann, 2020 – Gouvea's sipo
Chironius grandisquamis (W. Peters, 1869) – Ecuador sipo
Chironius laevicollis (Wied, 1824) – Brazilian sipo
Chironius laurenti Dixon, Wiest & Cei, 1993
Chironius leucometapus 
Chironius maculoventris 
Chironius monticola Roze, 1952 – mountain sipo
Chironius multiventris Schmidt & Walker, 1943 – long-tailed machete savane
Chironius quadricarinatus (F. Boie, 1827)
Chironius scurrulus (Wagler, 1824) – smooth machete savane
Chironius septentrionalis Dixon, Wiest & Cei, 1993
Chironius spixii 
Chironius vincenti (Boulenger, 1891) – St. Vincent blacksnake

Nota bene: A binomial authority in parentheses indicates that the species was originally described in a genus other than Chironius.

Etymology
The specific names, brazili and spixii, are in honor of Brazilian herpetologist Vital Brazil and German biologist Johann Baptist von Spix, respectively.

Conservation status
The St. Vincent Blacksnake, Chironius vincenti is listed as critically endangered by the IUCN Red List due to its extremely limited range on the Island of St. Vincent.

References

Further reading
Fitzinger LI (1826). Neue Classification der Reptilien nach ihren natürlichen Verwandtschaften. Nebst einer Verwandtschafts-tafel und einem Verzeichnisse der Reptilien-Sammlung des K. K. zoologischen Museum's zu Wien. Vienna: J.G. Heubner. five unnumbered + 67 pp. + one plate. (Chironius, new genus, p. 60). (in German and Latin).
Freiberg M (1982). Snakes of South America. Hong Kong: T.F.H. Publications. 189 pp. . (Chironius, pp. 30, 64, 92).
Torres-Carvajal O, Echevarría LY, Lobos SE, Kok PJR (2018). "Phylogeny, diversity and biogeography of Neotropical sipo snakes (Serpentes: Colubrinae: Chironius)". Molecular Phylogenetics and Evolution 130: 315–329.

 
Colubrids
Snake genera
Taxa named by Leopold Fitzinger